Mueang Loei is the capital district (amphoe mueang) of Loei province, northeastern Thailand.

Location
Neighboring districts are (from the north clockwise): Chiang Khan, Pak Chom, Na Duang, Erawan, Wang Saphung, Phu Ruea, and Tha Li of Loei Province.

The important water resource is the Loei River.

History
The district was one of the five original districts of Loei Province established in 1897 during the thesaphiban administrative reforms. At first named Kut Pong after the central tambon, it was later renamed Mueang Loei.

Administration
The district is divided into 14 sub-districts (tambons), which are further subdivided into 130 villages (mubans). The town (thesaban mueang) Loei covers tambon Kut Pong. There are two more townships (thesaban tambons): Na O covers the whole of tambon Na O, and Nam Suai covers parts of tambon Nam Suai. There are a further 13 tambon administrative organizations (TAO).

References

External links
http://www.amphoemuangloei.com Website of district (Thai)

Mueang Loei